Brain Dance may refer to:
"Brain Dance", a song by Annihilator from the album Set the World on Fire, 1993
"The Brain Dance", a song by Animals as Leaders from the album The Madness of Many, 2016